Salma Arastu (born 1950, Rajasthan, India) is an Indian artist, living in North America.

Early life
Arastu is a native of Rajasthan and had a masters in fine arts from Maharaja Sayajirao University of Baroda. Arastu's main mediums include clay sculpture, paper mache, and print work. She has also worked extensively with calligraphy and produces greeting cards for the American Muslim community. Arastu has been exhibiting her paintings for over last thirty years in India, Iran, Kuwait, Germany and the United States, having more than thirty solo and group exhibitions. Furthermore, her work has been placed in many museums around world for example, "State Museum of Art, Harrisburg, PA" and "Museum Of Modern Art, Hyderabad, India". 
Her exhibitions have been held in notable places e.g. "Stanford Art Spaces", Stanford University, "art Museum", Radford University, and she has earned several awards for her work.

Selected solo exhibitions 

Salma Arastu has had more than thirty solo exhibitions and even more group exhibitions. Some of her selected solo exhibitions are following.

 2006 September: Artjaz Gallery in Philadelphia, PA
 2005 September: The Hope Horn Gallery Scranton University, Scranton PA
 2005 April: Penn State University gallery at Berks campus Reading PA
 2005 February: Radford University Art Museum, Radford University, Radford, VA
 2004 May: The Art Alliance, Cornwell, Upstate New York
 2004 April: Gelabert Studios Gallery, New York, NY
 2003 April: Artjaz Gallery, Philadelphia, PA
 2003 April: Black Cultural Center, Lafayette College, and Easton, PA 
 2002 May: Barns and Noble, Broadway, New York
 2002 April: Open Space Gallery, Allentown, PA
 2000 September: ArtJaz Gallery, Philadelphia, PA
 2000 June: Sweet cream cafe gallery, Strousburg, PA
 2000 An Invitational exhibition of paintings and six-week residency program in Schwabisch Gmund, Germany. 15 March 2000 to the end of April 2000.
 1999 Reading Art Museum. Reading, PA
 1998 Art Gallery De Art Magic, Easton, PA
 1998 Art Heritage, New Delhi, India
 1998 A Gallery, New York, NY
 1997 The Gallery at Northampton Community College, Bethlehem, PA
 1997 Hub Gallery, Moravian College, Bethlehem, PA
 1993 Design Accent, Allentown, PA.
 1992 Cedar Crest College, Allentown, PA.
 1992 Powers Art Gallery, East Strousburg University, PA.
 1991 Fine Arts Commission, Rotunda Gallery, Bethlehem, PA.
 1989 Springer Gallery, Allentown, PA.
 1989 DuBois Gallery & Display Cases Maginnes Hall, Lehigh University,
 1989 John's United Church of Christ, Kutztown, PA. East Penn Emerging Art 1986 Boushari Gallery, Kuwait City, Kuwait.
 1984 British Council Gallery, Kuwait City, Kuwait.
 1981 Kala Bhavan Gallery, Hyderabad, India.
 1979 Shridharani Gallery, New Delhi, India.
 1978 Azad Gallery, Tehran, Iran.
 1977 Art Gallery, Hotel Intercontinental, Tehran, Iran.
 1976 Kala Bhavan Gallery, Hyderabad, India.
 1975 Kala Bhavan, Hyderabad, India.
 1973 Academy of Fine Arts Gallery, Calcutta, India.

Notes

References

External links 
Salma Arastu's Art Collection (official website).
 Salma Arastu's Official Islamic Greeting Cards and Arabic Calligraphy collection.

Modern painters
Indian emigrants to the United States
1950 births
Living people
Calligraphers of Arabic script
American calligraphers
Indian calligraphers
American women artists of Indian descent
20th-century Indian women artists
Women artists from Rajasthan
Maharaja Sayajirao University of Baroda alumni
21st-century American women
Indian artists
American people of Indian descent